A pope is the Bishop of Rome and the leader of the Catholic Church. Approximately 100 papal tombs are at least partially extant, representing less than half of the 265 deceased popes, from Saint Peter to Benedict XVI.

For the first few centuries in particular, little is known of the popes and their tombs, and available information is often contradictory. As with other religious relics, multiple sites claim to house the same tomb. Furthermore, many papal tombs that recycled sarcophagi and other materials from earlier tombs were later recycled for their valuable materials or combined with other monuments. For example, the tomb of Pope Leo I was combined with Leos II, III, and IV circa 855, and then removed in the seventeenth century and placed under his own altar, below Alessandro Algardi's relief, Fuga d'Attila. The style of papal tombs has evolved considerably throughout history, tracking trends in the development of church monuments. Notable papal tombs have been commissioned from sculptors such as Michelangelo and Gian Lorenzo Bernini.

Most extant papal tombs are located in St. Peter's Basilica, other major churches of Rome (especially Archbasilica of Saint John Lateran, Santa Maria sopra Minerva and Basilica di Santa Maria Maggiore), or other churches of Italy, France, and Germany.



Note on non-extant tombs

Many early tombs no longer exist due to repeated translations or destruction. This list does not include non-extant papal tombs. Information about these tombs is generally incomplete and uncertain. Locations of destroyed or lost papal tombs include:
 Saint Peter's tomb, around which the following popes were traditionally believed to have been buried: Pope Linus, Pope Anacletus, Pope Evaristus, Pope Telesphorus, Pope Hyginus, Pope Pius I, Pope Anicetus (later transferred to the Catacomb of Callixtus), and Pope Victor I. Epigraphic evidence exists only for Linus, with the discovery of a burial slab marked "Linus" in 1615; however, the slab is broken such that it could have once read "Aquilinius" or "Anullinus".
 The Catacombs of Rome, specifically the Catacomb of Callixtus, the Catacomb of Priscilla (beneath San Martino ai Monti), the Catacomb of Balbina, the Catacomb of Calepodius, the Catacomb of Pontian, and the Catacomb of Felicitas, which were emptied by repeated translations by the ninth century.
 Papal tombs in Old St. Peter's Basilica, which once numbered over 100 papal tombs, nearly all of which were destroyed during the sixteenth/seventeenth century demolition.
 Archbasilica of Saint John Lateran, where over a dozen tombs were destroyed in two fires (1308 and 1361).
Other tombs not included in this list are:
 Tombs of antipopes, which—with few exceptions—are obscure or destroyed. An antipope is a historical papal claimant currently regarded by the Roman Catholic Church as illegitimate.  Notably, however, the Tomb of Antipope John XXIII is in the Battistero di San Giovanni in Florence.
 Santi Vincenzo e Anastasio a Trevi, the resting place of the precordium of 22 popes from Sixtus V (1585–1590) to Leo XIII (1878–1903).

1st–5th centuries

1st century

2nd century

3rd century

4th century

5th century

6th–10th centuries

6th century

7th century

8th century

9th century

10th century

11th–15th centuries

11th century

12th century

13th century

14th century

15th century

16th–21st centuries

16th century

17th century

18th century

19th century

20th century

21st century

See also

 Index of Vatican City-related articles

Notes

References

External links
  Information and images on papal tombs (1417 and 1799) from the Requiem project

Lists of tombs
Sarcophagi
Tombs, Extant
Papal, extant